Vinhomes Times City, commonly referred to as Times City, is an urban complex in Hanoi invested by Vingroup, with a total ground area of 360,367 to 360,500 square meters, total floor area of about 2,181,298 m2 to 2,205,595 m² commenced construction in 2011, with total estimated investment capital of 23,883 billion to 30,308 billion đồng. Times City includes many functional subdivisions: apartments, commercial centers, hospitals, schools, parks, lakes, swimming pools, aquariums, squares with featured water music.

References

https://vinhomes.vn/en/Vinhomes-Smart-City

Buildings and structures in Hanoi
Vingroup
Vietnamese records